Sublet is a 2020 Israeli-American romantic comedy-drama film, directed by Eytan Fox, from a screenplay by Fox and Itay Segal. It stars John Benjamin Hickey and Niv Nissim.

It had its world premiere at the PJFF on November 8, 2020. It was released in a limited release on June 11, 2021, prior to video on demand on July 9, 2021, by Greenwich Entertainment.

Premise
Michael (John Benjamin Hickey) is a travel writer for The New York Times, travelling to Tel Aviv for work. He is a former bestselling author, having written a book about New York City during the peak of the AIDS crisis, in which he lost his boyfriend to the disease.
Instead of staying at a hotel, Michael meets Tomer (Niv Nissim), a younger film student in need of some extra money, and sublets his apartment in a popular neighbourhood. The two gay men face a generational gap that puts their personal and clashing life philosophies into perspective.

Cast
John Benjamin Hickey as Michael
Niv Nissim as Tomer
Lihi Kornowski as Daria
Miki Kam as Malka
Peter Spears as David
Tamir Ginsburg as Kobi
Gabriel Loukas as Guy

Release
The film had its world premiere at the Philadelphia Jewish Film Festival on November 8, 2020. Prior to, Greenwich Entertainment acquired U.S. distribution rights to the film. It also screened at the BFI Flare: London LGBT Film Festival on March 17, 2021. It was previously set to have its world premiere at the Tribeca Film Festival, but the festival was delayed due to the COVID-19 pandemic. It was released in the United States in a limited release on June 11, 2021, prior to video on demand on July 9, 2021.

Critical reception
Sublet received positive reviews from film critics. The site's critical consensus reads, "Thoughtful and well-acted, Sublet tenderly depicts a romance that reaches across the generation gap -- and into the viewer's heart." On Metacritic, the film holds 67 out a 100 based on 19 reviews, indicating general favorable reviews.

Armond White of National Review praised director's "Platonic and political sophistication", while Jay Weissberg of Variety said that "No surprises are to be found in Eytan Fox's neatly packaged gay midlife crisis story, which favors convention over risk-taking".

Harvey Karten of Shock Ya! gave Sublet a B+, while Michael O'Sullivan of The Washington Post and Peter Sobczynski of RogerEbert.com gave the film 2.5 out of 4 stars.

References

External links

2020 drama films
2020 LGBT-related films
American LGBT-related films
Israeli LGBT-related films
2020s English-language films
2020s American films